Dr Jagjit Singh Taunque MBE, DL is the Deputy Lieutenant of the West Midlands. He has represented the Birmingham Inter Faiths Council on the University Court since 1995, becoming an Honorary Life Member of the Court in 1998. He is also Chairman of the Birmingham Valuation Tribunal and of the Punjab Culture Centre, Trustee of Birmingham Council of Faiths and Patron of Birmingham International Council.

He was appointed a Member of the Order of the British Empire (MBE) in June 2000.

He is currently Deputy Lieutenant of West Midlands.

References

Year of birth missing (living people)
Living people
Deputy Lieutenants of the West Midlands (county)
Members of the Order of the British Empire
Punjabi people
British people of Indian descent